Flying Boys is a 2004 South Korean film, written and directed by Byun Young-joo, and starring Yoon Kye-sang and Kim Min-jung. The film had 114,478 admissions in South Korea.

Plot summary 
Min-jae is a high school senior who lives with his father, an airline pilot, and is struggling with his studies. For some time he has had a crush on Su-jin, a girl his own age who lives in the same apartment building, but has lacked the courage to approach her. Su-jin, meanwhile, is frustrated with her family life and keen to get away. She plans to become a veterinarian, even though she is no good with animals.

Min-jae and Su-jin are unexpectedly thrown together when they are both pressured into joining a local ballet class. As time passes they get to know each other, as well as the other oddball characters who make up the rest of the class.

Cast 
 Yoon Kye-sang as Kang Min-jae
 Kim Min-jung as Hwangbo Su-jin
 Do Ji-won as Jung-sook
 On Joo-wan as Chang-seob
 Lee Joon-gi as Dong-wan
 Greena Park as Seung-eon
 Nah Eun-kyung
 Lee Jong-won
 Kim Dong-wook as Kim Ki-tae
 Kim Kap-soo as supervising teacher (cameo)

References

External links 
 
 
 Review at Koreanfilm.org

2000s teen drama films
2004 films
Films about ballet
2000s Korean-language films
South Korean coming-of-age drama films
South Korean teen drama films
2004 drama films
2000s coming-of-age drama films
2000s South Korean films